Calvatia gigantea, commonly known as the giant puffball, is a puffball mushroom commonly found in meadows, fields, and deciduous forests usually in late summer and autumn. It is found in temperate areas throughout the world.

Description
The inside of mature giant puffballs is greenish brown, whereas the interior of immature puffballs is white. The large white mushrooms are edible when young.

The fruiting body of a puffball mushroom will develop within the period of a few weeks and soon begin to decompose and rot, at which point it is dangerous to eat.  Unlike most mushrooms, all the spores of the giant puffball are created inside the fruiting body; large specimens can easily contain several trillion spores. Spores are yellowish, smooth, and 3–5 μm in size.

The classification of this species has been revised in recent years, as the formerly recognized class Gasteromycetes, which included all puffballs, has been found to be polyphyletic. Some authors place the giant puffball and other members of genus Calvatia in order Agaricales. Also, the species has in the past been placed in two other genera, Lycoperdon and Langermannia. However, the current view is that the giant puffball is Calvatia.

Conservation status
The giant puffball is widespread and common in the UK. It is protected in parts of Poland and is of conservation concern in Norway.

Cooking

All true puffballs are considered edible when immature, but can cause digestive upset if the spores have begun to form, as indicated by the color of the flesh being not pure white (first yellow, then brown).  Immature gilled species still contained within their universal veil can be look alikes for puffballs. To distinguish puffballs from poisonous fungi, they must be cut open; edible puffballs will have a solid white interior. Some similar mushrooms have the white interior (or yellowish) but also have the silhouette of a cap-type mushroom on the interior when cut open. These are young cap-type mushrooms and may be poisonous.

Medical uses
Puffballs are a known styptic and have long been used as wound dressing, either in powdered form or as slices 3 cm thick. The fungus was often harvested prior to battles for this purpose.

It is the main source of the anti-tumor mucoprotein calvacin, which is present only in tiny quantities.

Similar fungi
Giant puffballs resemble the earthball (Scleroderma citrinum). The latter are distinguished by a much firmer, elastic fruiting body, and having an interior that becomes dark purplish-black with white reticulation early in development.  Scleroderma citrinum is poisonous and may cause mild intoxication.

Images

References

Further reading

External links
 Video footage of mature Giant Puffballs
 The Giant Puffball
 VOLATILES OF THE GIANT PUFFBALL MUSHROOM (Calvatia gigantea)

Lycoperdaceae
Fungi of Europe
Fungi of North America
Edible fungi
Fungi found in fairy rings
Puffballs
Taxa named by August Batsch
Taxa named by Christiaan Hendrik Persoon